This article gives an outline of age restrictions.

List

Age of candidacy 
Age of consent
Age requirements in gymnastics 
Age segregation
Defense of infancy
Legal drinking age 
Legal smoking age
Legal working age
List of countries by minimum driving age
Mandatory retirement 
Marriageable age 
Military use of children 
Retirement age
Voting age

See also

Ageism
Age of majority
Content rating
Legal status of tattooing in European countries
Legal status of tattooing in the United States
NSFW

Age and society
Society-related lists